Paul Blackthorne (born 5 March 1969) is an English actor. Although born in Shropshire, he spent his early childhood on UK military bases in Britain and Germany.

Blackthorne broke into acting via television commercials in England. His breakthrough commercial in the UK came in the Grim Reaper commercial for Virgin Atlantic, which was hugely successful. Numerous radio commercials followed.

Blackthorne's first film role was in the Academy award nominated Bollywood film Lagaan, released in the year 2001. Since then, he has mostly appeared in American films and television shows. He had recurring roles in the American series ER and 24, both in 2004, and has been a regular cast member in the series The Dresden Files (2007), in which he played the title character of Harry Dresden, as well as Lipstick Jungle (2008–09) and Arrow (2012–2018).

Film 

Blackthorne's first film role was as Captain Andrew Russell in the Oscar-nominated Bollywood film Lagaan. He spent six months learning Hindi for the role.

He also starred in the independent feature-length film Four Corners of Suburbia, winner of both the Crossroads Film Festival in Best Narrative Feature (2006) and in the category of Best Composer at the Avignon Film Festival, Avignon, France (2006).

Additional indie film credits include Bret Easton Ellis's This Is Not an Exit, and a starring role in the British film The Truth Game. Blackthorne appeared as Jonas Exiler in Special, with Michael Rapaport.

Blackthorne's directorial debut This American Journey was released in 2013. The road trip documentary film follows Blackthorne and Australian photographer Mister Basquali as they travel across America interviewing everyday Americans about how they feel about their country and their hopes for its future. The film was featured at the Hollywood, Carmel, Ojai and Big Bear Film Festivals. It was released through Cinema Libre Studios. Blackthorne would be joined the cast of Dark Ascension, as "Willis".

Television 
In 2002, Blackthorne portrayed British doctor Matt Slingerland on Presidio Med and made notable appearances as Guy Morton in the British television series Holby City, Liam MacGregor in Peak Practice, Doctor Jeremy Lawson in NBC's ER and biological terrorist Stephen Saunders on 24. He also made appearances on Medium in two roles (one uncredited as Henry Stoller, Junior), Deadwood, and an episode of Monk Season 5 Episode 10 "Mr. Monk and the Leper" as quirky dermatologist Aaron Polinski. He appeared as Shane Healy, a British musician and husband of Wendy Healy (played by Brooke Shields), in the NBC series Lipstick Jungle for two seasons. He played an IRA terrorist in the US series Burn Notice in 2009 in one episode. In 2010, he appeared in two episodes of Leverage as an arms dealer and in an episode of CSI: Miami directed by Rob Zombie. Later that year he had a recurring role in The Gates as Christian Harper. Also on 7 December 2010, he appeared in the Christmas episode ("Secret Santa") of the SyFy series Warehouse 13. He appeared in a two-part cliffhanger during the mid-season break of White Collar Season 2.

In the Sci Fi Channel's 2007 series, The Dresden Files, Blackthorne portrayed the lead character, wizard / detective Harry Dresden.

He starred as Clark Quietly in the ABC original paranormal/adventure/horror television series The River about a group of people on a mission to find a missing TV explorer in the Amazon.

In 2012, Blackthorne joined the main cast of The CW superhero drama series Arrow as Detective Quentin Lance. He left the series at the end of the sixth season in May 2018, but returned in a guest role in the eighth and final season in the episode "Fadeout".

Personal life 
Paul Blackthorne is also an accomplished photographer. His exhibition, Delhi to Manhattan, appeared at Tibet House US in New York City from April to June 2009, to benefit the Tibetan children of the city of Dharamsala.

In 2001, shortly after filming of Lagaan finished in India, the town where filming took place was levelled by an earthquake, including the apartment building in which the cast of Lagaan was staying. To assist the earthquake victims, Blackthorne exhibited his photography in a special show in London.

Blackthorne is a supporter of Arsenal F.C.

He is the godfather of actor Jacob Dudman.

Filmography

Film

Television

Video games

References

External links 

 
 

1969 births
Living people
20th-century English male actors
21st-century English male actors
Actors from Shropshire
English male film actors
English male television actors
Male actors in Hindi cinema
People from Wellington, Shropshire
Photographers from Shropshire